Marylin Pla (born 19 February 1984 in Athis-Mons, Essonne) is a French former pair skater. With Yannick Bonheur, she is a three-time (2005–2007) French national champion and placed 14th at the 2006 Winter Olympics.

In the 2006–2007 season, they missed the Grand Prix series as a result of Bonheur's hand injury, which occurred while practicing the triple twist and led to surgery.

Programs 
(with Bonheur)

Competitive highlights

Pairs career with Bonheur

Singles career

References

External links 
 
 

1984 births
Living people
People from Athis-Mons
French female pair skaters
Olympic figure skaters of France
Figure skaters at the 2006 Winter Olympics
Sportspeople from Essonne
21st-century French women